Randolph Township, Indiana may refer to one of the following places:

 Randolph Township, Ohio County, Indiana
 Randolph Township, Tippecanoe County, Indiana

See also 

Randolph Township (disambiguation)

Indiana township disambiguation pages